Live Floating Anarchy 1977 is a 1978 live album by Planet Gong, a combination of Gong's Daevid Allen and Gilli Smyth and the band Here & Now. It was recorded in Toulouse on 6 November 1977, apart from the track "Opium for the People" which was a studio recording. It was originally released on the French LTM record label, run by Jean Karakos, who had previously run Tapioca and BYG.

Track listing

Personnel
 Prof. Steffy Sharpstrings P.A. (Stephan Lewry) – guitar, lips, glissando guitar, vocal on track 2
 Keith da Missile Bass (Keith Bailey) – bass guitar and tree trunk
 Kif Kif Le Batteur (Keith Dobson) – drums and asides besides
 Gavin Da Blitz (Gavin Allardyce) – synthesizer and pinball flip
 Suze Da Blooz & Anni Wombat – choir of angels
 Gilli Smyth – space whisper & pome
 Dingbat Alien (Daevid Allen) – drongophone, nose, gliss guitar, guitar guitar, bi focal vocals & wordplay
Technical
Grant Showbiz – engineer

References

External links
Band website

Gong (band) live albums
1978 live albums